Frederick Ebenezer John Lloyd (1859–1933) was an independent Catholic bishop with the American Catholic Church. He was born at Milford Haven, Wales.

In 1915, René Vilatte founded the American Catholic Church. It was at this time that he received Lloyd into the church and on December 19, 1915, he was consecrated as a bishop at Saint David's Chapel on East Thirty-Sixth Street, Chicago. Vilatte was assisted by Bishop Paolo Miraglia-Gulotti, formerly of Italy and then of New York and working with Vilatte in the United States. During the consecration the archbishop addressed the congregation and newly consecrated prelate saying:
 
It needs to prophet to fortell for you and the American Catholic Church a great future in the Province of God. The need for a Church both American and Catholic, and free from paparchy and all foreign denominations, has been felt for many years by Christians of all the denominations. May your zeal and apostolic ministry be crowned with success.
 
By 1914, the dynamic energy of Vilatte was diminishing and in a synod held in Chicago on April 10, 1920, he offered to retire and named Lloyd as his successor as Primate and Metropolitan of the American Catholic Church (ACC).

On September 8, 1929, Lloyd consecrated John Churchill Sibley as Missionary Archbishop and Vicar General of the Order of Antioch in England.

The spread of the American Catholic Church from 1920 until his death in 1933 was largely due to his initiative.

References

1859 births
1933 deaths
People from Milford Haven
Bishops of Independent Catholic denominations
American bishops